The Reverend Henry Lucas (c. 1610 – July 1663) was  an English clergyman and politician who sat in the House of Commons from 1640 to 1648.

Life

Lucas was a student at St John's College, Cambridge. He became secretary to Henry Rich, 1st Earl of Holland. In April 1640, he was elected Member of Parliament for Cambridge University in the Short Parliament. He was re-elected MP for Cambridge University for the Long Parliament in November 1640. He was excluded from parliament in 1648 under Pride's Purge.

Lucas died unmarried in Chancery Lane, London, and was buried in Temple Church on 22 July 1663. He is now mainly remembered as a benefactor.

Family legend has that he died on 7/6/1663, and he was 1 of 5 children of Edward and Mary (Covert) Lucas.

Bequest

In his will, Lucas founded the Henry Lucas Charity with a bequest of £7,000, to be spent on building an almshouse for poor old men and on employing a chaplain as its Master.  The men were to be chosen from the poorest inhabitants of the Forest Division of Berkshire and the Bailiwick of Surrey in or near the Forest.  The original Hospital was built by Lucas’s executors on 1.5 acres (6,000 m²) of land in Wokingham in 1666. On the death of the executors in 1675, the Drapers' Company of the City of London inherited the trusteeship of the Hospital.  In 1923 an Act of Parliament dissolved the ancient Corporation, and provided for the admission of married couples, and for the employment of a Matron.

By 1999, the original building was no longer suitable for use as a modern almshouse.  The original Hospital was sold and in July 2002 the Henry Lucas Charity was merged with the Whiteley Homes Trust. Sixteen double cottages were built in Whiteley Village near Walton-on-Thames in Surrey to provide accommodation for more than twice as many people as was possible in the Hospital, and are known as The Henry Lucas Cottages.

The Drapers used a coat of arms to commemorate Lucas on the Henry Lucas Cottages at Whiteley Village, copying that on Lucas Hospital.  This can be described as: Quarterly with a crescent for difference on the fess point:  1 and 4, Argent, a fesse between six annulets gules;  2 and 3, Gules, on a bend argent, seven billets one two one two and one palewise of the bend sable, a quartering of the Lucas and Morieux families' coats of arms.

Lucas also bequeathed his collection of 4,000 books (including Galileo's Dialogo of 1632) to the University Library at Cambridge, along with enough land to give an income of £100 a year, which was to be used to fund a professorship of "mathematick", now the Lucasian Professorship of Mathematics.

References

External links
Henry Lucas' Charity
Whiteley Village
Henry Lucas Cottages

1610s births
1663 deaths
Members of the pre-1707 Parliament of England for the University of Cambridge
English MPs 1640 (April)
English MPs 1640–1648
Henry
Alumni of St John's College, Cambridge